Playlist is a digital-only compilation by English singer Geri Halliwell, released on 6 May 2016 by Parlophone. The album track listing comprises her nine UK singles, a selection of songs from her first three studio albums and b-sides that have never appeared on a studio album before.

Track listing

References

2016 albums
Parlophone albums
Geri Halliwell albums